The Zhuokou River, also spelled Chokou River or Jhuokou River, is a tributary of the Laonong River, which in turn is a tributary of the Gaoping River, the main stream of this major river system in southwestern Taiwan. It flows through the Taoyuan and Maolin Districts of Kaohsiung City for 50 km.

Bridges
 Duonagao Suspension Bridge
 Teldreka Bridge

See also
List of rivers in Taiwan

References

Rivers of Taiwan
Landforms of Kaohsiung